National Route 219 is a national highway of Japan connecting Chūō-ku, Kumamoto and Miyazaki, Miyazaki in Japan, with a total length of 170.4 km (105.88 mi).

References

National highways in Japan
Roads in Kumamoto Prefecture
Roads in Miyazaki Prefecture